USS Wathena has been the name of more than one United States Navy ship, and may refer to:

, a cargo ship in commission in 1919.
, a large harbor tug placed in service in 1973 and stricken from the Naval Register in 1997

United States Navy ship names